Pablo González Díaz (born 7 July 1992) is a Mexican professional footballer who plays as a midfielder for Liga MX club Puebla.

Career
González began his career in the Club Puebla under-17 youth squad in 2010. He worked up the ranks in the club's under-20 squad and made his professional first team debut in the 2012 Copa MX tournament against C.D. Irapuato González made his Liga debut on August 17 against Monarcas Morelia that same year.

External links
Info
Data

Liga MX players
Living people
Mexican footballers
Club Puebla players
Cafetaleros de Chiapas footballers
Atlas F.C. footballers
1992 births
People from Puebla (city)
Association football midfielders